The CWA World Tag Team Championship was a major professional wrestling tag team title defended in the Continental Wrestling Association. It lasted from 1980 through 1983.

Title history

Footnotes

References

See also
Continental Wrestling Association
CWA Tag Team Championship

Continental Wrestling Association championships
Tag team wrestling championships